Mjølvik is a small, isolated fishing village in Tromsø Municipality in Troms og Finnmark county, Norway. The village (and island) is only accessible by boat. There is a ferry that stops at the village three times each week (as of 2017). There are three residents of Mjølvik.

References

Villages in Troms
Tromsø